16th Street–Woodside is a light rail station that is currently under construction in the Woodside neighborhood of Silver Spring, Maryland. It will be part of the Purple Line in Maryland. The station will be located at 16th Street.

History 
The Purple Line is under construction as of 2022 and is scheduled to open in 2026.

Station layout
The station consists of two side platforms.

References

Purple Line (Maryland)
Railway stations scheduled to open in 2026
Railway stations in Montgomery County, Maryland
Silver Spring, Maryland (CDP)